I Love Lucy (also known as I Love Lucy: The Movie) is a 1953 American comedy film that is a spin-off of the sitcom I Love Lucy. Except for one test screening in Bakersfield, California,  the film was never theatrically released and was shelved.

Lucille Ball and Desi Arnaz co-star. Some scenes were directed by Edward Sedgwick, the final film work of his long Hollywood career. Sedgwick died in March 1953.

Plot
The film plays out with three first-season episodes edited together into a single story: "The Benefit", "Breaking the Lease", and "The Ballet", with new footage included between episodes to help transition the episodes into one coherent storyline. As the series routinely took the format of filming scenes in chronological order, this adds to the "show within a show within a show" format of the film, as viewers watch the cast perform the episodes live. The film itself ends with a "curtain call", as the cast comes out and Arnaz thanks the audience for their support.

Cast
 Lucille Ball as Lucy Ricardo / Herself
 Desi Arnaz as Ricky Ricardo / Himself
 Vivian Vance as Ethel Mertz  / Herself
 William Frawley as Fred Mertz / Himself

Development
Shortly after the end of the first season of I Love Lucy, Desi Arnaz and Lucille Ball decided to cash in on their show's popularity by compiling several episodes of the first season of the series into a movie.

A test screening in Bakersfield, California, went very well and Desilu (through distributor United Artists) prepared to release the film. But Metro-Goldwyn-Mayer demanded the film be shelved because they felt it would diminish interest in the upcoming MGM film, The Long, Long Trailer, in which Lucy and Desi co-starred and were contractually bound to promote. The I Love Lucy movie was ultimately forgotten.

Format and framing sequence
Unlike most movie adaptations, I Love Lucy: The Movie is presented as a "show within a show within a show". The film is framed around a plot involving a young married couple (played by Ann Doran and Benny Baker) attending the filming of an episode of I Love Lucy. After an opening sequence of the couple arriving at the studio, there is a brief introduction by the show's announcer, Roy Rowan, as he introduces Desi Arnaz, who speaks to the studio audience and introduces the cast (something Arnaz would do throughout the run of the series).

Lost and found
After plans for a theatrical release were scuttled by MGM, the film was largely forgotten and the twelve minutes of new footage shot for the film were considered to be lost forever. However, in 2001, the film was found and clips of it were featured in I Love Lucy's 50th Anniversary Special. A screening was held in August 2001 at the fifth Loving Lucy fan convention in Burbank, California.

Home media
The film was released on DVD on October 23, 2007 as one of the features on a bonus disc in The "I Love Lucy" Complete Series boxset.

The disc received a separate release on April 27, 2010.

In 2015, the movie was released in 1080p as part of I Love Lucy: Ultimate Season 2.

References

External links
 

1953 comedy films
1953 films
American comedy films
1950s English-language films
Films based on television series
Films directed by Edward Sedgwick
Films edited from television programs
Metro-Goldwyn-Mayer films
Television films based on television series
I Love Lucy
1950s American films
Rediscovered American films
1950s rediscovered films